The arrondissement of Bourges is an arrondissement of France in the Cher department in the Centre-Val de Loire region. It has 128 communes.

Composition

The communes of the arrondissement of Bourges, and their INSEE codes, are:

 Achères (18001)
 Les Aix-d'Angillon (18003)
 Allogny (18004)
 Annoix (18006)
 Arçay (18008)
 Argenvières (18012)
 Assigny (18014)
 Aubinges (18016)
 Avord (18018)
 Azy (18019)
 Bannay (18020)
 Barlieu (18022)
 Baugy (18023)
 Beffes (18025)
 Belleville-sur-Loire (18026)
 Bengy-sur-Craon (18027)
 Boulleret (18032)
 Bourges (18033)
 Brécy (18035)
 Bué (18039)
 La Chapelle-Montlinard (18049)
 La Chapelle-Saint-Ursin (18050)
 La Chapelotte (18051)
 Charentonnay (18053)
 Chârost (18055)
 Chassy (18056)
 Chaumoux-Marcilly (18061)
 Civray (18066)
 Concressault (18070)
 Couargues (18074)
 Couy (18077)
 Crézancy-en-Sancerre (18079)
 Crosses (18081)
 Dampierre-en-Crot (18084)
 Étréchy (18090)
 Farges-en-Septaine (18092)
 Feux (18094)
 Fussy (18097)
 Gardefort (18098)
 Garigny (18099)
 Groises (18104)
 Gron (18105)
 Henrichemont (18109)
 Herry (18110)
 Humbligny (18111)
 Jalognes (18116)
 Jars (18117)
 Jussy-Champagne (18119)
 Jussy-le-Chaudrier (18120)
 Lapan (18122)
 Léré (18125)
 Levet (18126)
 Lissay-Lochy (18129)
 Lugny-Champagne (18132)
 Lunery (18133)
 Mareuil-sur-Arnon (18137)
 Marmagne (18138)
 Marseilles-lès-Aubigny (18139)
 Menetou-Râtel (18144)
 Menetou-Salon (18145)
 Ménétréol-sous-Sancerre (18146)
 Montigny (18151)
 Morogues (18156)
 Morthomiers (18157)
 Moulins-sur-Yèvre (18158)
 Neuilly-en-Sancerre (18162)
 Neuvy-Deux-Clochers (18163)
 Nohant-en-Goût (18166)
 Le Noyer (18168)
 Osmoy (18174)
 Parassy (18176)
 Pigny (18179)
 Plaimpied-Givaudins (18180)
 Plou (18181)
 Poisieux (18182)
 Précy (18184)
 Primelles (18188)
 Quantilly (18189)
 Rians (18194)
 Saint-Ambroix (18198)
 Saint-Bouize (18200)
 Saint-Caprais (18201)
 Saint-Céols (18202)
 Saint-Doulchard (18205)
 Sainte-Gemme-en-Sancerrois (18208)
 Saint-Éloy-de-Gy (18206)
 Sainte-Solange (18235)
 Saint-Florent-sur-Cher (18207)
 Saint-Georges-sur-Moulon (18211)
 Saint-Germain-du-Puy (18213)
 Saint-Just (18218)
 Saint-Léger-le-Petit (18220)
 Saint-Martin-d'Auxigny (18223)
 Saint-Martin-des-Champs (18224)
 Saint-Michel-de-Volangis (18226)
 Saint-Palais (18229)
 Saint-Satur (18233)
 Sancergues (18240)
 Sancerre (18241)
 Santranges (18243)
 Saugy (18244)
 Savigny-en-Sancerre (18246)
 Savigny-en-Septaine (18247)
 Senneçay (18248)
 Sens-Beaujeu (18249)
 Sévry (18251)
 Soulangis (18253)
 Soye-en-Septaine (18254)
 Le Subdray (18255)
 Subligny (18256)
 Sury-en-Vaux (18258)
 Sury-ès-Bois (18259)
 Sury-près-Léré (18257)
 Thauvenay (18262)
 Thou (18264)
 Trouy (18267)
 Vailly-sur-Sauldre (18269)
 Vasselay (18271)
 Veaugues (18272)
 Verdigny (18274)
 Vignoux-sous-les-Aix (18280)
 Villabon (18282)
 Villegenon (18284)
 Villeneuve-sur-Cher (18285)
 Villequiers (18286)
 Vinon (18287)
 Vorly (18288)
 Vornay (18289)

History

The arrondissement of Bourges was created in 1800.

As a result of the reorganisation of the cantons of France which came into effect in 2015, the borders of the cantons are no longer related to the borders of the arrondissements. The cantons of the arrondissement of Bourges were, as of January 2015:

 Les Aix-d'Angillon
 Baugy
 Bourges 1st Canton
 Bourges 2nd Canton
 Bourges 3rd Canton
 Bourges 4th Canton
 Bourges 5th Canton
 Chârost
 Henrichemont
 Léré
 Levet
 Saint-Doulchard
 Saint-Martin-d'Auxigny
 Sancergues
 Sancerre
 Vailly-sur-Sauldre

References

Bourges